C. miserabilis may refer to:
 Ctenus miserabilis, a spider species in the genus Ctenus
 Cyanophrys miserabilis, a butterfly species in the genus Cyanophrys

See also
 Miserabilis (disambiguation)